This border skirmish during the Heglig Crisis, was an armed confrontation between South Sudanese and Sudanese soldiers. The incident raised tensions of the possibility of an all-out war between South Sudan and Sudan.

Events
On the night of April 17, 2012, a South Sudanese soldier positioned along the disputed borderline, crossed onto the Sudanese side to get water from a river. He was shot dead by a Sudanese soldier. The shooting sparked subsequent clashes between South Sudanese SPLA and Sudanese SAF troops in the area. The fighting lasted for hours, killing 22 soldiers.

A Sudanese spokesman claimed the action was intended to create another battle front in the war to distract Sudanese military forces in the region. A South government spokesmen labeled the fight as a "misunderstanding" and said he did not think violence would continue there

This incident briefly raised tensions between South Sudan and Sudan that the border conflict centered around the Heglig oil fields, has the potential to spillover over elsewhere along the disputed border.

References

South Sudan–Sudan border
Battles involving Sudan
Battles involving South Sudan
Conflicts in 2012
Battles in 2012